Ungmennafélagið Snæfell, simply known as Snæfell, is a sport club in Stykkishólmur, Iceland. There are four divisions: basketball, football, Swimming and Golf.

Basketball

Men's basketball

Snæfell men's team made it to the Úrvalsdeild finals in 2004, 2005 and 2008 before winning the national championship in 2010.

Women's basketball

Snæfell women's team won the national championship three times in a row, in 2014, 2015 and 2016. In 2017, it lost to Keflavík in the finals.

Football
Snæfell men's team plays in the 4. deild karla, the fifth tier of Icelandic football, and in the Icelandic Football Cup. On May 16, 2012, Snæfell lost to Haukar 0-31 in the Football Cup.

References

External links
 Official website

 
Football clubs in Iceland
Multi-sport clubs in Iceland